Miloš Bečvář (born 21 January 1957) is a Czech cross-country skier. He competed at the 1980 Winter Olympics and the 1984 Winter Olympics.

References

External links
 

1957 births
Living people
Czech male cross-country skiers
Olympic cross-country skiers of Czechoslovakia
Cross-country skiers at the 1980 Winter Olympics
Cross-country skiers at the 1984 Winter Olympics
People from Strakonice
Sportspeople from the South Bohemian Region